Luis González Roca (born 30 January 1958) is a Bolivian footballer. He played in two matches for the Bolivia national football team from 1979 to 1981. He was also part of Bolivia's squad for the 1979 Copa América tournament.

References

1958 births
Living people
Bolivian footballers
Bolivia international footballers
Place of birth missing (living people)
Association football defenders